Harry Eugene Burke (May 19, 1878 –  March 26, 1963) was an American entomologist and authority on the Buprestidae (metallic wood-boring beetles) and other wood-boring beetles and forest pests of the western United States. He was the first forest entomologist to be hired and assigned to study insects on the west coast, and the first entomology graduate of Washington State University. Born in Paradise Valley, Nevada, he earned a B.S. in 1902, and M.S. in 1908 at Washington Agricultural College and School of Science (now Washington State University). He earned a PhD from Stanford University in 1923. He published over 60 articles, and co-wrote the textbook "Forest Insects" with R. W. Doane, E. C. Van Dyke, and W. J. Chamberlin.

References

External links

Guide to the John M. Miller and H. E. Burke papers on western forest entomology, 1907-2005 at Bancroft Library, UC Berkeley

1878 births
1963 deaths
American entomologists
People from Humboldt County, Nevada
Washington State University alumni
Stanford University alumni
Coleopterists
20th-century American zoologists